Guangzhou Baiyun International Airport  is the international airport serving Guangzhou, the capital of Southern China's Guangdong province. 

The two airport codes were inherited from the former Baiyun Airport, and the IATA code is derived from Guangzhou's historical romanization Canton. Baiyun Airport serves as a hub for China Southern Airlines, FedEx Express, 9 Air, Hainan Airlines and Shenzhen Airlines. In 2020, due to the impact of the COVID-19 pandemic on aviation, it was the world's busiest airport by passenger traffic, handling 43.8 million passengers.

In 2021, Guangzhou Baiyun International Airport was the world's eighth-busiest airport by passenger traffic, with 40.2 million passengers handled, making it also the busiest airport outside the United States, and the busiest in China. As for cargo traffic, the airport was China's second-busiest, as well as the second-busiest airport worldwide in terms of aircraft movements.

Overview

1932–2004

The old Baiyun Airport opened in 1932. Due to the expansion of Guangzhou, the airport could not expand to meet passengers needs as buildings surrounded the airport. On 5 August 2004, the new Baiyun Airport opened and the old airport was closed.

Since 2004
The new airport is located in Guangzhou's Baiyun District and Huadu District and opened on 5 August 2004 as a replacement for the 72-year-old, identically named former airport, which is now closed. "Baiyun" means "white cloud" in Chinese and refers to the Baiyun Mountain (Baiyunshan), near the former airport even though the mountain is much closer to downtown Guangzhou than it is to the new airport. It is also referred to as "New Baiyun" to distinguish it from the previous airport, but this is not a part of the official name.

Former curfews and restrictions did not apply to the new airport so it could operate 24 hours a day, allowing China Southern Airlines to maximise intercontinental route utilisation with overnight flights. Other airlines also benefit from the removal of previous restrictions.

Data
 Runways: 3—,  and 
 Aircraft parking bays: 173 (passenger apron and cargo apron)
 Current passenger capacity: 45 million passengers per year
 Planned passenger capacity in 2020: 80 million passengers per year
 Current cargo capacity: 1 million tonnes
 Planned cargo capacity in 2020: 2.5 million tonnes
 Destinations: 100 (mostly domestic)
 Branch airports: Jieyang, Meizhou, Zhanjiang
 Planned branch airports: Shaoguan, Zhaoqing

Facilities

Terminal 1
Terminal 1 has three components, Main Terminal, Area A and Area B. All check-in counters and most retail stores are placed at the Main Terminal. The two concourses controlled by individual security checkpoints, named Area A and Area B, are the boarding gates, security checkpoints, border control, customs and quarantine, baggage reclaim and relative facilities.

Since 24 January 2016, East Piers 1 and 2 are dedicated to serve international flights; domestic flights occupy the rest.

Terminal 2
Terminal 2 opened on April 26, 2018, with an area measuring over 808,700 square metres, making it one of the world's largest airport terminal facilities. When Terminal 2 officially operates, it will be typically home to China Southern Airlines. Most SkyTeam member airlines will also typically operate in Terminal 2. However, on 31 December 2019, China Southern withdrew from the SkyTeam airline alliance.

The new transport centre (GTC) is under construction on the south side of terminal 2; passengers will be able to go to Guangzhou downtown by taking metro, rail, bus or taxi there.

FedEx Asia-Pacific hub

On July 13, 2005, FedEx Express signed a contract with the airport authority to relocate its Asia-Pacific hub from Subic Bay International Airport in the Philippines to Baiyun Airport. At the beginning of operation, the hub employed more than 800 people and operated 136 flights a week, providing delivery services among 20 major cities in Asia and linking these cities to more than 220 countries and territories in the world. The Guangzhou hub was, at the time of the opening, the largest FedEx hub outside the United States, but it was later surpassed by the expanded hub at Paris' Charles de Gaulle Airport.

The hub has its own ramp control tower, a first for an international air express cargo company facility in China, which enables FedEx to control aircraft movements on the ground, aircraft parking plans as well as loading and unloading priorities. Included at the hub are a unique package and sorting system with 16 high-speed sorting lines, seven round-out conveyor belts and 90 primary and secondary document-sorting splits. With the new advanced system, up to 24,000 packages can be sorted an hour at the start of operations.

Construction began in 2006 and the hub was originally scheduled to open on December 26, 2008. On November 17, 2008, after several months of testing, FedEx announced that the opening date was delayed to the first half of 2009 when the hub was expected to be fully operational. FedEx claimed that the revised operation date "provided FedEx with the necessary time to fully test all systems and processes, as well as work closely with the Guangzhou authorities to ensure all necessary approvals are in place".

On December 17, 2008, the hub completed its first flight operations test. A FedEx MD-11 aircraft took off from Subic Bay International Airport in the Philippines and landed at Baiyun Airport at 5:50 am. The flight was handled by the new FedEx hub team, using the FedEx ramp control tower and the new 24,000 package per hour sort system. Following a successful operations' process, the flight departed on time for its final destination at Charles de Gaulle Airport in Paris, France. This Asia-Europe flight route operated four times per week during test run. FedEx also announced that the hub would start operation on February 6, 2009.

FedEx closed its 13-year-old Asia-Pacific hub at Subic Bay of northern Philippines on February 6, 2009, with the last flight leaving for Taiwan just before dawn, while hub operations have moved to Baiyun Airport. The first flight that arrived at the new FedEx Asia-Pacific hub originated from Indianapolis International Airport. The MD-11 aircraft landed at 11:07 pm at Baiyun International Airport from Charles de Gaulle International Airport in Paris, marking the opening and full operations of the new Asia-Pacific hub.

Runways
Guangzhou Baiyun International Airport now has three runways. The third runway opened on February 5, 2015, which temporarily tackled the long‐standing capacity obstacle. The operation of the third runway expanded Baiyun Airport's capacity, pushing business up. Unfortunately, the third runway can only be used for landing, as its airspace conflicts with Foshan Airport. The airport is planning to build two additional runways.

Expansion

In August 2008, the airport's expansion plan was approved by the National Development and Reform Commission.

The centrepiece of the project is a  Terminal 2. Other facilities comprise new indoor and outdoor car parks and a transportation centre with metro and inter-city train services. The total cost of the entire project was estimated to be around ¥18.854 billion. Construction of the third runway began in 2012 and the runway commenced operation in early 2015. The whole project including the new terminal was scheduled to be finished in February 2018, at which time the airport will be able to handle 80 million passengers and 2.5 million tonnes of cargo a year.

The third phase expansion plan has been approved by the National Development and Reform Commission of China. After the expansion, Baiyun Airport will have three terminals, a satellite concourse, five runways and a high-speed railway station. The airport will be able to handle 120 million passengers, 3.8 million tons freight and 775,000 aircraft movements a year. The whole expansion project is estimated to be finished in 2025.

Airlines and destinations

Passenger

Cargo

Statistics

Ground transportation

Inter-terminal
There is a free shuttle bus that goes between Terminals 1 and 2.

Road
The airport is connected to downtown Guangzhou by the S41 Guangzhou Airport Expressway.

Rail
Guangzhou–Foshan circular intercity railway, which is under construction, will serve Baiyun Airport North railway station (for Terminal 2), Baiyun Airport South railway station (for Terminal 1) and Baiyun Airport East railway station (for Terminal 3) in the airport. The rail will connect the airport to the Panyu railway station and the Huadu railway station.

Metro
Baiyun International Airport is served by the Airport South Station (serving Terminal 1) and the Airport North Station (serving Terminal 2) on Line 3 of Guangzhou Metro.

In the future, Guangzhou Metro Line 22 may serve the airport, connecting it to downtown Guangzhou.

Bus
There are 5 Airport Express lines and 6 Airport Non-stop lines between airport and downtown. Buses take passengers to city's major hotels, grand plaza and transportation center, such as Garden Hotel, Guangdong Hotel, CITIC Plaza, Haizhu Square, Tianhe Coach Station, Guangzhou North Station among other destinations.

To service passengers out of Guangzhou city, the airport also provides intercity bus service. The buses will take passengers from/to Dongguan, Foshan, Zhongshan, Huizhou, Jiangmen among other destinations.

See also

Guangzhou Baiyun International Airport (former)
List of airports in Guangdong province, from 1911-current (Zh-Wiki)
List of airports in China
List of the busiest airports in China
World's busiest airports by cargo traffic
World's busiest airports by passenger traffic

References

External links
 Official website

Transport in Guangzhou
Airports in Guangdong
Baiyun District, Guangzhou
Huadu District
Airports established in 2004
2004 establishments in China